The men's 100 metre freestyle competition at the 1995 Pan Pacific Swimming Championships took place on August 11 at the Georgia Tech Aquatic Center.  The last champion was Jon Olsen of US.

This race consisted of two lengths of the pool, both lengths being in freestyle.

Records
Prior to this competition, the existing world and Pan Pacific records were as follows:

Results
All times are in minutes and seconds.

Heats
The first round was held on August 11.

B Final 
The B final was held on August 11.

A Final 
The A final was held on August 11.

References

1995 Pan Pacific Swimming Championships
Men's 100 metre freestyle